Lizzie Ida Grace Willis  (1881–1968) was a notable New Zealand civilian and military nurse, hospital inspector, matron, army nursing administrator. She was born in Wellington, New Zealand, in 1881.

Willis was a nurse at Wellington Hospital. In August 1914, she was one of six nurses who went with the expeditionary force that took over German Samoa. In July 1915, she was a Sister on the hospital ship, Maheno. In 1916 she was working in the New Zealand Army Nursing Service (NZANS) in France.  

In the 1918 New Year Honours, Willis was appointed an Associate of the Royal Red Cross. In 1935, she was awarded the King George V Silver Jubilee Medal. She was appointed an Officer of the Order of the British Empire (Military Division) in the 1944 New Year Honours, in recognition of her service as matron-in-chief of the New Zealand Army Nursing Service.

References

1881 births
1968 deaths
New Zealand nurses
People from Wellington City
New Zealand military personnel
New Zealand women nurses
New Zealand Officers of the Order of the British Empire
Associate Members of the Royal Red Cross